James Arthur Osmond (born April 16, 1963), also known as Little Jimmy Osmond, is an American singer, actor, and businessman. He is the youngest member of the sibling musical group the Osmonds. As a solo artist, Osmond has accumulated six gold records, one platinum record, and two gold albums.

Early life and family

Osmond was born in Canoga Park, California, the ninth and youngest child of Olive May (née Davis; 1925–2004) and George Virl Osmond (1917–2007). His older siblings are Virl, Tom, Alan, Wayne, Merrill, Jay, Donny, and Marie Osmond. He is also the only one of the nine Osmond siblings not to have been born in the family's hometown of Ogden, Utah. Osmond was taught by tutors to accommodate his professional life. He was also educated by Mary Osmond, his brother Merrill's wife.

Career
He received his first gold record at age five for a song he recorded in Japanese, "My Little Darling". He was the first Osmond to achieve this. His recording of "Long Haired Lover from Liverpool" in 1972 resulted in The Guinness Book of World Records designating him the youngest performer to have a #1 single on the UK Singles Chart. The song was credited to "Little Jimmy Osmond". In Japan, he had the moniker "Jimmy Boy".

In 1978, Osmond starred in the feature film The Great Brain. He starred in other acting roles as well, including two episodes of the TV series Fame. He performed on stage and television often with his older siblings. In 1985, he met Latino impresario Manuel Montoya at A&M Records, and this led to his only Spanish recording, "Siempre Tu". He toured Latin American markets, including Puerto Rico, Mexico, Venezuela and Chile. On the heels of this, he served as a juror at the 1986 edition of the OTI Festival. The 2012 Osmonds album I Can't Get There Without You was performed with Jimmy Osmond on lead vocals; it was the first album to feature Jimmy as lead singer, as older brother Merrill Osmond historically held that role in the band. In live performances, Jimmy often serves as a co-lead singer with Merrill, a role previously held by Donny during the band's heyday in the early 1970s.

Osmond is president of Osmond Entertainment. He has developed and supervised most of the Osmonds' merchandising business, as well as producing hundreds of hours of programming for networks including ABC, PBS, the BBC and the Disney Channel.

He has also performed in musical theater. Like his brother Donny many years earlier, he starred in Joseph and the Amazing Technicolor Dreamcoat. He also starred in Boogie Nights in 2004 at the Grand Theatre, Blackpool. In 2005, Jimmy Osmond's American Jukebox Show toured the UK in 2005, again to the Grand Theatre in Blackpool. Co-stars of the show included Billy Pearce and Jimmy's brothers Jay and Wayne. From December 11, 2010 to January 2, 2011, he played Buttons in Cinderella at the White Rock Theatre in Hastings; from December 16, 2011, to January 15, 2012, he  played the role of Wishee Washee in Aladdin at Grand Theatre, Swansea; and from December 1, 2017, to January 7, 2018, the role of Abanzar in the pantomime Aladdin at His Majesty's Theatre in Aberdeen.

He has appeared on several UK TV shows, including the reality TV series I'm a Celebrity... Get Me Out of Here! broadcast by ITV in 2005 (he finished in fourth place), a 2006 appearance on All Star Family Fortunes, a celebrity version of Come Dine with Me, Celebrity Family Fortunes, and Everybody Dance Now.  In January 2010, Osmond participated in the British ITV1 celebrity reality television programme Popstar to Operastar. In 2016 Jimmy was a finalist on the UK version of Celebrity Masterchef.

In 2014, Osmond authored a semi-autobiographical children's picture book, Awesome Possum Family Band. The same year, he took over the operations of the Andy Williams Moon River Theatre in Branson, Missouri, where he is now responsible for producing and booking shows. In 2015, Osmond was awarded an honorary doctorate of arts and humanities by Iowa Wesleyan University. The first Osmond family member to receive that distinction, he delivered the keynote commencement speech on May 9, 2015.

Personal life 
Osmond married Michelle Larson on June 7, 1991. They have four children. Sophia Michelle (born September 28, 1994), Zachary James (born October 10, 1997), Arthur Wyatt (born February 16, 2000) and Isabelle Olive Renee (born February 27, 2002).

Like the rest of his family, Osmond is a member of the Church of Jesus Christ of Latter-day Saints (LDS Church).

On December 27, 2018, following his performance as Captain Hook in the Birmingham Hippodrome's staging of the pantomime Peter Pan, Osmond was taken to the hospital where he was diagnosed with having had a stroke. He had previously suffered a stroke in 2004 caused by a since-corrected patent foramen ovale. He spoke publicly for the first time since the stroke in April 2019, stating that he was in good health and was taking a "long-overdue break" from show business for the time being. He has not spoken publicly since then but has continued to operate his businesses including the Andy Williams Performing Arts Center. In a February 2020 interview, Jimmy's brother Merrill stated that Jimmy continued to recover, still planned on maintaining his business ventures, and that Merrill hoped that Jimmy would eventually return to the group.

Discography

Albums
 Little Jimmy Osmond (Japan, 1972)
 Killer Joe (1972) (# 105 Hot 200)
 Little Arrows (1975)
 Kimi Wa Pretty (Japan, 1981)
 Siempre Tu (in Spanish; Mexico, 1985)
 Keep the Fire Burnin’ (US 2000, UK 2001)

Singles

Singles in other countries
 "My Little Darling" / "Peg o' My Heart" (Japan)
 "Chuk Chuk" / "Jimmy's Lullaby" (Japan)
 "Jingle Bells" / "I Saw Mommy Kissing Santa Claus" (Japan)
 "Red Roses for a Blue Lady" (Sweden)
 "Happy Robbers" / "I Found a Little Happiness" (Japan)
 "Goodbye Mr. Tears" / "Put Your Hand in the Hand"
 "Kimi Wa Pretty" / "Tokyo Savannah" (Japan)
 "Long Distance" / "After All" (Japan)
 "Living in Love" / "One More Chance" (Japan)
 "Siempre Tu" (Mexico)
 "Dos en Uno" (Mexico)
 "Otono y Primavera" / "Tu Me Haces Falta" (Mexico)
 "Shine"

Soundtracks
 Yes Virginia, There Is a Santa Claus (1974)
 The Great Brain (1978)
 Hugo the Hippo (1976)
 The Osmonds (animated TV series, 1972)

Filmography

Television
 The Osmonds (1972) – animated TV series
 The NBC Saturday Morning Preview Revue (1974)
 Donny & Marie (1976–1979)
 (1981) - Nippon TV
 Fame (1982)
 The Love Boat  (1982)
 The Love Boat  (1985)
 Inside the Osmonds (2001)
 We Are Family (2003)
 Branson Jubilee (2005)
 I'm a Celebrity... Get Me Out of Here! (2005)
 All Star Family Fortunes (2006)
 Celebrity Come Dine with Me
 Never Mind The Buzzcocks (2011)
 Celebrity Bedlam (2012)
 Celebrity MasterChef (2016)
 Celebrity Antiques Road Trip (2016)
 Countdown (2017)
 A Christmas Chase: Celebrity Special (2017)
 Celebrity Pointless (2017)

Film
 The Great Brain (1978) based on the book by John D. Fitzgerald, portraying title character.
 Hugo the Hippo (1976), singer

Books

References

External links
 Jimmy Osmond Official website
 
 Jimmy Osmond at the Official site of the Osmond Family
 Jimmy Osmond on Twitter
 Jimmy Osmond's profile for the ITV reality show I'm A Celebrity, Get Me Out Of Here!
 Little Jimmy Osmond

Living people
1963 births
21st-century American male musicians
21st-century trumpeters
American child singers
American male trumpeters
American male pop singers
American trumpeters
I'm a Celebrity...Get Me Out of Here! (British TV series) participants
Latter Day Saints from California
Latter Day Saints from Utah
Osmond family (show business)
People with congenital heart defects
Popstar to Operastar contestants
The Osmonds members